People with the Italian given name or surname Giuliano have included:

In arts and entertainment

Surname
 Geoffrey Giuliano, American author
 Maurizio Giuliano, writer and Guinness-record-holding traveler

Given name
 Giuliano Gemma, actor
 Giuliano Đanić, Croatian pop-folk singer

In crime
 Luigi Giuliano, former Neapolitan Camorra boss and pentito
 Salvatore Giuliano, Sicilian bandit

In politics

Surname
 Carla Giuliano, Italian MP
Neil Giuliano, former mayor of Tempe, Arizona, US
 Sebastian Giuliano, mayor of Middletown, Connecticut, US

Given name
 Giuliano Amato, former prime minister of Italy
 Giuliano Poletti, Italian politician
 Giuliano Urbani, Italian politician

In sport

Surname
 Carmelo Giuliano, Argentine footballer
 Luigi Giuliano (footballer), Italian international footballer

Given name
 Giuliano de Paula, Brazilian footballer known mononymously as Giuliano
 Giuliano Alesi, French racing driver

In other fields
 Giuliano de' Medici, nobleman
 Pope Julius II, born Giuliano della Rovere
 Giuliano Pancaldi, Italian historian of science

See also
 Giuliano e i Notturni
 Guliano Diaz
 Guiliano (name)
 Giulio (disambiguation)
 Giuliani
 Julian (given name)
 Julian (surname)
 Juliano (given name)
 San Giuliano (disambiguation)

Italian masculine given names